Pyramids of Mars is the third serial of the 13th season of the  British science fiction television series Doctor Who. Written by Robert Holmes and Lewis Greifer under the pseudonym of "Stephen Harris" and directed by Paddy Russell, the serial was first broadcast in four weekly parts on BBC1 from 25 October to 15 November 1975. 

The serial is set in England and Egypt and on Mars in 1911. In the serial, the burial chamber of the alien Osiran Sutekh (Gabriel Woolf), the inspiration for the Egyptian god Set, is unearthed by the archaeology professor Marcus Scarman (Bernard Archard). Alive but immobilised, Sutekh seeks his freedom by using Professor Scarman as his servant to destroy the jewel in a pyramid on Mars which is keeping him prisoner. Influenced by the gothic horror genre and films such as The Mummy, the serial was met with widespread critical acclaim, being praised for its atmosphere and production.

Plot

In 1911 Egypt, archaeology professor Marcus Scarman excavates a pyramid and finds the door to the burial chamber is inscribed with the Eye of Horus. His Egyptian assistants flee in fear as he enters the chamber alone and is hit by a beam of green light. The Fourth Doctor, intending to land in UNIT's base, ends up in the sealed wing of an English estate after the TARDIS was forced out of its flight path and Sarah Jane Smith sees an apparition of a Typhonian Animal in the console room. The two are found by the butler, who reveals they are in the Scarman estate, an old priory, which has been taken over by a mysterious Egyptian named Ibrahim Namin claiming to represent Scarman. Scarman's friend Dr Warlock has also arrived at the priory to demand an explanation from Namin on Scarman's whereabouts. When Namin threatens Warlock with a revolver, the Doctor and Sarah barely manage to prevent his murder, although Warlock is severely wounded.  The three escape the estate, with Namin and a robot dressed like an Egyptian mummy in pursuit.  The trio reach a hunting lodge used by Scarman's brother Laurence, whose marconiscope intercepted a signal from Mars. The Doctor decodes the signal as "Beware Sutekh", explaining to Sarah Jane that Sutekh is the last of a powerful alien race called the Osirans, his imprisonment by his brother Horus being the inspiration for ancient Egyptian mythology.

Namin and the mummies greet the arrival, via a spacetime tunnel portal disguised as a sarcophagus, of Sutekh's servant, who kills Namin, now superfluous. The servant is revealed to be Marcus Scarman, now a corpse animated by Sutekh's will. Scarman and the robots secure the estate's perimeter with a forcefield and start hunting down the humans still inside the barrier.  Scarman finds and kills Warlock, but is then ordered by Sutekh to prioritize the construction of an Osirian war missile aimed at Mars.  Meanwhile, the Doctor disrupts the tunnel using the TARDIS key before retrieving Namin's ring from his corpse. After Sarah suggests they should just leave in the TARDIS, the Doctor takes her and Laurence to 1980 and the devastated Earth Sutekh will leave behind if allowed to escape.  There is no choice—they must return to 1911 and stop Sutekh.

Once back in 1911, the Doctor makes a jamming unit with Namin's ring to break Sutekh's hold over Scarman and the servitor robots. Laurence, believing this will kill his brother, attempts to stop the Doctor from activating the device, but Sarah Jane stops him. A pair of robots kill a local poacher outside before attacking the hunting lodge. The marconiscope is destroyed in the struggle, the feedback disabling one of the robots. Sarah Jane uses Namin's ring to send the other back to Scarman. The Doctor decides to blow up the partially assembled rocket, and Laurence suggests using the blasting gelignite kept in the poacher's hut. The Doctor and Sarah Jane leave to obtain the gelignite, ordering Laurence to strip the bindings from the deactivated robot. Scarman soon arrives at the lodge, and Laurence (still unable to accept that his brother is truly dead) attempts to rekindle his brother's humanity, but gets strangled instead. After he and Sarah Jane return, they find Laurence dead. The Doctor disguises himself as the disabled robot to set up the explosives before Sarah Jane detonates them with a shot from a rifle. Sutekh telekinetically suppresses the explosion using mental force.  Left with but one option, the Doctor uses the space-time tunnel to reach Sutekh and break his concentration, allowing the explosion to destroy the rocket. His escape now foiled, a furious Sutekh interrogates the Doctor before deciding to turn him into a thrall to transport Scarman to the Pyramids of Mars to destroy the Eye of Horus, which maintains his prison.

Upon arrival on Mars, Scarman has the Doctor strangled, and proceeds with the servitor into the pyramid. However, the Doctor's respiratory bypass system allows him to quickly recover, and, now free of Sutekh's control, he and Sarah Jane follow Scarman through a series of chambers requiring solving logic puzzles to pass. They are unable, however, to stop Scarman from destroying the Eye, and Scarman, having served his purpose, disintegrates.  The Doctor then realises that Sutekh will not be released for two minutes due to the time required for the Eye's radio signal to travel from Mars to Earth. The Doctor and Sarah return to the Priory and use a module from the TARDIS to extend the terminus of the time tunnel into the far future, resulting in Sutekh dying of old age before reaching the end. However, the portal then overloads, and he and Sarah Jane flee into the TARDIS as the priory is consumed in flames.

Continuity
Sarah Jane wears a dress which the Doctor says belonged to Victoria Waterfield. She remarks that the puzzles are similar to those in the Exxilon City in Death to the Daleks (1974), although she personally never entered the City.

Production

The Universal Pictures film The Mummy (1932) and especially the Hammer horror films The Mummy (1959) and Blood from the Mummy's Tomb (1971) influenced the story. As originally written by Lewis Greifer it was considered unworkable. Greifer was unavailable to perform rewrites, so the scripts were completely rewritten by script editor Robert Holmes. The pseudonym used on transmission was Stephen Harris. Pyramids of Mars contributes to the UNIT dating controversy, one of the contradictions in the Doctor Who universe.

The exterior scenes were shot on the Stargroves estate in Hampshire, a Victorian mansion noted for its ornate, Gothic revival style of architecture which was owned by Mick Jagger at the time. The same location would be used during the filming of Image of the Fendahl (1977). The new TARDIS console, which debuted in the preceding story Planet of Evil, does not appear again until The Invisible Enemy (1977). Owing to the cost of setting up the TARDIS console room for the filming of only a handful of scenes, a new console set was designed for the following season. Tom Baker and Elisabeth Sladen improvised a number of moments in this story, most notably a scene in Part Four where the Doctor and Sarah Jane start to walk out of their hiding place and then when they see a mummy, quickly dart back into it. Baker based the scene on a Marx Brothers routine.

Several scenes were deleted from the final broadcast. A model shot of the TARDIS landing in the landscape of a barren, alternative 1980 Earth was to be used in Part Two, but director Paddy Russell decided viewers would feel more impact if the first scene of the new Earth was Sarah's reaction as the TARDIS doors opened. Three scenes of effects such as doors opening and the Doctor materializing from the sarcophagus were removed from the final edit of Part Four because Russell felt the mixes were not good enough. These scenes were included on the DVD, along with an alternate version of the poacher being hunted down in Part Two, and a full version of the Osiran rocket explosion.

Although the name of Sutekh's race is pronounced "Osiran" throughout the serial, the scripts and publicity material spell it as "Osirian" in some places and as "Osiran" in others.

Cast notes
The story features a guest appearance by Michael Sheard; he was cast by director Paddy Russell without any audition, purely on the recommendation of production assistant Peter Grimwade. Sheard previously featured in The Ark (1966) and The Mind of Evil (1971) and would later appear in The Invisible Enemy (1977), Castrovalva (1982) and Remembrance of the Daleks (1988). Bernard Archard previously played Bragen in The Power of the Daleks (1966). Michael Bilton previously played Teligny in The Massacre of St Bartholomew's Eve (1966). George Tovey was the father of Roberta Tovey, who appeared as Susan in the films Dr. Who and the Daleks (1965) and Daleks' Invasion Earth 2150 A.D. (1966).

Gabriel Woolf reprised his role as Sutekh in the Faction Paradox audio dramas Coming to Dust (2005), The Ship of a Billion Years (2006), Body Politic (2008), Words from Nine Divinities (2008), Ozymandias (2009) and The Judgment of Sutekh (2009), from Magic Bullet Productions and in The New Adventures of Bernice Summerfield: The Triumph of Sutekh for Big Finish Productions. He also provided the voice of Sutekh for the comedy sketch Oh Mummy: Sutekh's Story, included on the DVD release of Pyramids of Mars. Woolf would go on to provide the voice of The Beast in the 2006 episodes "The Impossible Planet" and "The Satan Pit". He also provided the voice of Governor Rossitor in the Big Finish audio plays Arrangements for War and Thicker than Water.

Broadcast and reception

The story was edited and condensed into a single, one-hour omnibus episode, broadcast on BBC1 at 5:50 pm on 27 November 1976, reaching 13.7 million viewers, the highest audience achieved by Doctor Who in its entire history to date. The figure was not bettered until the broadcast of City of Death in 1979. BBC2 broadcast the four episodes on consecutive Sundays from 6–27 March 1994 at noon, reaching 1.1, 1.1, 0.9 & 1.0 million viewers respectively.

In 1985, Colin Greenland reviewed Pyramids of Mars for Imagine magazine, and stated that it was "Dr Who at its eclectic best [...] A yeasty brew of Hammer horror, Egyptian mythology, and sf with a touch of H. G. Wells." Paul Cornell, Martin Day, and Keith Topping gave the serial a positive review in The Discontinuity Guide (1995), praising the "chilling" adversary and some of the conversations.  In The Television Companion (1998), David J. Howe and Stephen James Walker described the first episode as "an excellent scene-setter" and the story as "near-flawless". They wrote that Pyramids of Mars gave the "fullest expression" of the Gothic horror era and had high production values and a good guest cast. In 2010, Patrick Mulkern of Radio Times called it "a bona fide classic" with "arguably the most polished production to date", and praised the powerful plot. However, he disliked how UNIT was dismissed in the season, and found "minor, amusing quibbles" with the plot. Charlie Jane Anders of io9 described Pyramids of Mars as "just a lovely, solid adventure story", highlighting the way the Doctor seemed outmatched, the pace, and Sarah Jane. In a 2010 article, Anders also listed the cliffhanger to the third episode — in which the Doctor is forced to confront Sutekh — as one of the greatest Doctor Who cliffhangers ever. In a 2014 Doctor Who Magazine poll to determine the best Doctor Who stories of all time, readers voted Pyramids of Mars to eighth place. In 2018, The Daily Telegraph ranked Pyramids of Mars at number 18 in "the 56 greatest stories and episodes", stating that "although the mummies are excellent, it is the organic characters who take centre stage, with Baker cementing the increasing alienness of his portrayal of the hero". They concluded that it was "pure gold".

In A Critical History of Doctor Who on Television, John Kenneth Muir queried the Egyptian mythology conceit that is woven through the whole story; he also questioned a number of apparently illogical story elements, such as why the robots that guard the priory were disguised as Egyptian mummies, and why the Osiran rocket was shaped as a pyramid. In his assessment, the use of ancient Egyptian objects and symbols by the Osiran race was inadequately explained in the script, and he contrasted Pyramids of Mars unfavourably with Stargate, a 1994 television series which relied heavily on the concept of ancient astronauts visiting Earth. Muir traced parallels with earlier Doctor Who serials such as The Dæmons (1971) and Terror of the Zygons (1975) which had also drawn on the idea of ancient Earth mythologies having extraterrestrial origins. Like The Dæmons and The Tomb of the Cybermen (1967), Pyramids of Mars exploited many familiar conventions of classic mummy films, but less successfully in Muir's view.

John J Johnston, vice-chair of the Egypt Exploration Society, explored the influences on Pyramids of Mars in the Encyclopedia of Mummies in History, Religion, and Popular Culture. He observed that the story drew heavily on a number of classic horror films such as Universal's The Mummy (1932) and Hammer's The Mummy (1959), in both its setting and the performance of the actors. Johnston also noted the influences of archaeology on the production design. According to Johnston, the robot mummies designed by the BBC's Barbara Kidd were inspired by an ancient rock painting of a mysterious domed-headed figure that had been discovered by Henri Lhote in the Sahara Desert in the 1950s, and which Lhote had nicknamed "the Great Martian God". Similarly, he considered Sutekh's mask to have been modelled on a statue of a bearded man dating from c.3500 BCE that had been excavated at Gebelein by Louis Lortet in 1908.

Commercial releases

In print

A novelisation of this serial, written by Terrance Dicks, was published by Target Books in December 1976. The novelisation contains a substantial prologue giving the history of Sutekh and the Osirans and features an epilogue in which a future Sarah researches the destruction of the Priory and how it was explained.  An unabridged reading of the novelisation by actor Tom Baker was released on CD in August 2008 by BBC Audiobooks. Pyramids of Mars was reprinted in the second volume of The Essential Terrance Dicks published on 26 August 2021 by BBC books.

Home media
The story first came out on VHS and Betamax in an omnibus format in February 1985. It was subsequently released in episodic format in April 1994. It was released on DVD in the United Kingdom on 1 March 2004. It was also released on 31 October 2011 as an extra on The Sarah Jane Adventures Series 4 DVD and Blu-ray boxset as a tribute to Elisabeth Sladen who had died earlier in the year.

In 2013 it was released on DVD again as part of the "Doctor Who: The Doctors Revisited 1–4" box set, alongside The Aztecs, The Tomb of the Cybermen and Spearhead from Space. Alongside a documentary on the Fourth Doctor, the disc features the serial put together as a single feature in widescreen format with an introduction from show runner at the time Steven Moffat, as well as its original version.

References

External links

Target novelisation

Fourth Doctor serials
 Doctor Who stories set on Mars
Ancient Egypt in fiction
Doctor Who pseudohistorical serials
Doctor Who serials novelised by Terrance Dicks
Fiction set in 1911
Mars in television
1975 British television episodes
Television episodes about ancient astronauts
Steampunk television episodes
Fiction about mummies
Fiction set in 1980
Television episodes set in Egypt
Television episodes set in the 1910s
Television episodes set in the 1980s